Coulteria is a genus of flowering plants in the legume family, Fabaceae. It belongs to the subfamily Caesalpinioideae.

Species
Coulteria comprises the following species:

 Coulteria cubensis (Greenm. 1897) S. Sotuyo & G.P. Lewis 2017
 Coulteria glabra (Britton & Rose 1930) J.L. Contreras, S. Sotuyo & G.P. Lewis 2017

 Coulteria mollis Kunth 1824
 Coulteria platyloba (S. Watson 1886) N. Zamora 2010
 Coulteria pringlei (Britton & Rose 1930) J.L. Contreras, S. Sotuyo & G.P. Lewis 2017
 Coulteria pumila (Britton & Rose 1930) S. Sotuyo & G.P. Lewis 2017

 Coulteria velutina (Britton & Rose 1930) S. Sotuyo & G.P. Lewis 2017

References

Caesalpinieae
Fabaceae genera